Maguarichi  is one of the 67 municipalities of Chihuahua, in northern Mexico. The municipal seat lies at Maguarichi village. The municipality covers an area of 937.2 km².

As of 2010, the municipality had a total population of 1,921, down from 2,116 as of 2005. 

The municipality had 158 localities, none of which had a population over 1,000.

Geography

Towns and villages
The municipality has 84 localities. The largest are:

References

Municipalities of Chihuahua (state)